Jordan Goodwin (born October 23, 1998) is an American professional basketball player for the Washington Wizards of the National Basketball Association (NBA). He played college basketball for the Saint Louis Billikens.

High school career
Goodwin attended Althoff Catholic High School in Belleville, Illinois. As a junior, he averaged 19 points, nine rebounds and 3.2 assists, leading his team to a 32–2 record and the Class 3A state title. He repeated as the Belleville News-Democrat Class 3A-4A Player of the Year. On January 24, 2017, Goodwin posted 26 points and 10 rebounds in a 74–64 win over Mount Vernon High School, passing Kevin Lisch as Althoff's all-time leading scorer. After the game, he underwent season-ending surgery for a partially torn labrum in his left shoulder, which had been occasionally bothering him for two years. Goodwin played for the St. Louis Eagles on the Amateur Athletic Union circuit and had success at the Nike Elite Youth Basketball League. A consensus four-star recruit, he committed to playing college basketball for Saint Louis over offers from Alabama, Butler, Creighton, Illinois, Missouri and Northwestern. Goodwin played football for Althoff as a tight end and wide receiver, helping his team achieve a Class 4A runner-up finish as a sophomore, and received football scholarship offers from Iowa and New Mexico.

College career
On January 13, 2018, Goodwin recorded the first triple-double in Saint Louis history, with 13 points, 15 rebounds and 10 assists in a 76–63 win over Duquesne. On February 10, he scored a career-high 28 points along with nine rebounds in a 70–62 victory over La Salle. Goodwin was suspended for the remainder of his freshman season for a violation of university policy after he was one of four players accused of sexual assault, although no charges had been filed and he was later cleared. As a freshman, he averaged 11.5 points, 7.5 rebounds and four assists per game. In his sophomore season, Goodwin averaged 10.5 points, 7.5 rebounds and 3.4 assists per game. He recorded 66 steals, the fifth-most in a season in program history. 

He assumed a leading role as a junior, describing himself as a player-coach. On December 19, 2019, Goodwin grabbed a career-high 19 rebounds while contributing 14 points and four assists in a 69–60 win over Southern Illinois. In his junior season, he averaged 15.5 points, 10.4 rebounds, 3.1 assists and 2.1 steals per game, earning First Team All-Atlantic 10 and Atlantic 10 All-Defensive Team honors. Goodwin led all NCAA Division I guards in double-doubles, with 15, and was the only Division I player standing under  to rank in the top 100 nationally in rebounding. He and Hasahn French were the only teammates in the nation to average double-doubles. Goodwin declared for the 2020 NBA draft before withdrawing his name and opting to return to Saint Louis. As a senior, he averaged 14.5 points, 10.1 rebounds, 3.9 assists, and 2 steals per game. Goodwin was named to the First Team All-Atlantic 10 and Atlantic 10 All-Defensive Team after breaking Saint Louis's record for steals.

Professional career

Washington Wizards / Capital City Go-Go (2021–present)
After going undrafted in the 2021 NBA draft, Goodwin joined the Washington Wizards for the 2021 NBA Summer League. On September 21, 2021, he signed with the Wizards. Goodwin was waived on October 16. In October 2021, he joined the Capital City Go-Go as an affiliate player. He averaged 15.8 points, 5.9 rebounds and 3.6 assists per game. 

On December 27, 2021, the Washington Wizards signed Goodwin to a 10-day contract. After his contract expired, he returned to the Go-Go.

Goodwin joined the Wizards during the 2022 offseason for training camp and had his deal converted to a two-way contract on October 15, 2022. On February 24, 2023, the Wizards signed him to a multi-year contract.

Career statistics

NBA

|-
| style="text-align:left;"|
| style="text-align:left;"|Washington
| 2 || 0 || 3.0 || .000 || .000 ||  || .5 || .0 || .0 || .0 || .0
|- class="sortbottom"
| style="text-align:center;" colspan="2"|Career
| 2 || 0 || 3.0 || .000 || .000 ||  || .5 || .0 || .0 || .0 || .0

College

|-
| style="text-align:left;"| 2017–18
| style="text-align:left;"| Saint Louis
| 26 || 26 || 33.4 || .372 || .235 || .691 || 7.5 || 4.0 || 2.0 || .6 || 11.5
|-
| style="text-align:left;"| 2018–19
| style="text-align:left;"| Saint Louis
| 36 || 35 || 34.2 || .403 || .263 || .511 || 7.5 || 3.4 || 1.8 || .3 || 10.5
|-
| style="text-align:left;"| 2019–20
| style="text-align:left;"| Saint Louis
| 31 || 31 || 35.9 || .473 || .282 || .538 || 10.4 || 3.1 || 2.1 || .2 || 15.5
|-
| style="text-align:left;"| 2020–21
| style="text-align:left;"| Saint Louis
| 21 || 21 || 33.1 || .430 || .314 || .643 || 10.1 || 3.9 || 2.0 || .2 || 14.5
|- class="sortbottom"
| style="text-align:center;" colspan="2"| Career
| 114 || 113 || 34.3 || .423 || .271 || .580 || 8.8 || 3.5 || 2.0 || .3 || 12.8

References

External links
Saint Louis Billikens bio

1998 births
Living people
American men's basketball players
Basketball players from Illinois
Capital City Go-Go players
People from Centreville, Illinois
Saint Louis Billikens men's basketball players
Shooting guards
Undrafted National Basketball Association players
Washington Wizards players